Bryan Anthony Shaw (born November 8, 1987) is an American professional baseball pitcher in the Chicago White Sox organization. He has played in Major League Baseball (MLB) for the Arizona Diamondbacks, Colorado Rockies, Seattle Mariners, and Cleveland Indians/Guardians.

Early life
Shaw was born to Richard, a member of the California Highway Patrol, and Michelle (Shelli) Shaw. He attended Livermore High School in Livermore, California where he played baseball, football, and basketball.

Career

Amateur
Shaw attended California State University, Long Beach. He played college baseball for the Long Beach State Dirtbags baseball team. Shaw's roommate in college was teammate Vance Worley. In 2007, Shaw played collegiate summer baseball with the Chatham A's of the Cape Cod Baseball League.

Arizona Diamondbacks

Shaw was selected in the second round of the 2008 Major League Baseball draft by the Arizona Diamondbacks. He was called up by Arizona on June 10, 2011. Shaw made his major league debut that day, coming in for Esmerling Vásquez, who had just given up a leadoff double. Shaw pitched one scoreless inning against the Florida Marlins, giving up two walks and one strikeout, coming against Scott Cousins.

Shaw was recalled from the Diamondbacks AAA affiliate Reno Aces on August 11, 2012.

Cleveland Indians

On December 11, 2012 Shaw was traded to the Cleveland Indians in a three-team deal involving Trevor Bauer and Shin-Soo Choo. Shaw and his wife, Kristen, had bought a house in Arizona the day before the trade.

Shaw had a good 2014 season. In 80 games and 76.1 innings, he finished 5-5 with a 2.59 earned run average (ERA), 64 strikeouts, and 2 saves. Shaw appeared in more games than any other big league pitcher that year.
 
In 2016, Shaw led the American League (AL) in games pitched again, with 75. He went 2-5 with a 3.24 ERA and helped Cleveland win the pennant. Shaw gave up the game-winning run to the Chicago Cubs in Game 7 of the 2016 World Series, in extra innings.

In 2017, Shaw was 4-6 with a 3.52 ERA in 79 games, and he threw a cutter 87.1% of the time, tops in MLB.

Colorado Rockies
On December 12, 2017, Shaw signed a three-year, $27 million deal, with the Colorado Rockies. Through 41 appearances in the first half of the season, Shaw endured the worst start to his career, posting an ERA of 7.57 in  innings, surrendering 50 hits. He was placed on the disabled list on June 25 with a calf injury. For the 2018 season, he was 4-6 with a 5.93 ERA. He threw a cutter 84.36% of the time, tops in MLB. In 2019, Shaw posted an ERA over 5 for the second straight season. He ended the 2019 season with a 3-2 record in 70 games. 

The Rockies released Shaw on July 17, 2020.

Seattle Mariners
Shaw signed a one-year deal with the Seattle Mariners on July 22, 2020. He was optioned to the alternate site on August 7, 2020. He was designated for assignment on August 15, 2020. Four days later, on August 19, he was outrighted from the 40-man roster and remained in the alternate site. Shaw elected free agency on October 14, 2020.

Cleveland Indians / Guardians (second stint)
On February 3, 2021, Shaw signed a minor league contract with the Cleveland Indians organization and was invited to spring training. The Indians selected Shaw's contract on March 31, 2021. In 2021 he led the majors with 81 games pitched and recorded a 3.49 ERA with 71 strikeouts in  innings. Shaw became a free agent on November 3, 2021. 

On March 25, 2022, Shaw signed a one-year major league contract with the newly-named Cleveland Guardians. Shaw appeared in 60 games for Cleveland in 2022, posting a 6-2 record and 5.40 ERA with 52 strikeouts in 58.1 innings pitched. He was designated for assignment on October 1, 2022. After clearing waivers, Shaw was outrighted to the minor leagues on October 3. He elected minor league free agency on November 10, 2022.

Chicago White Sox
On February 21, 2023, Shaw signed a minor league contract with the Chicago White Sox organization.

Personal life
Shaw and his wife, Kristen, have one son together.

References

External links

1987 births
Living people
People from Livermore, California
Major League Baseball pitchers
Baseball players from California
Arizona Diamondbacks players
Cleveland Indians players
Colorado Rockies players
Seattle Mariners players
Cleveland Guardians players
Long Beach State Dirtbags baseball players
Chatham Anglers players
Missoula Osprey players
South Bend Silver Hawks players
Visalia Rawhide players
Mobile BayBears players
Scottsdale Scorpions players
Reno Aces players